Labrador Airways Limited, operating as Air Labrador, was a regional airline based at the Goose Bay Airport in Happy Valley-Goose Bay, Newfoundland and Labrador, Canada. It operated scheduled daily passenger and freight services throughout Labrador and Quebec, as well as charter operations with the options of landing in remote and off strip destinations with skis, wheels and floats. The airline's main base was Goose Bay Airport, with a secondary hub at Lourdes-de-Blanc-Sablon Airport, Quebec. Its motto was "The Spirit of Flight" (French: "Esprit du vol").

History 
The airline was established and started operations in 1948, as Newfoundland Airways operating float-equipped aircraft from a base in Gander, Newfoundland on charter, mail and freight work to northern Newfoundland and Labrador. Since then the base of the company has moved to Goose Bay. It was purchased in 1983 by Provincial Investments Inc., owned by Roger Pike, along with associate company, Labrador Aviation Services Ltd. Air Labrador was owned by the Pike Family, but then taken over by Philip Earle in 2010. Air Labrador conducted a fantasy flight in the 1990s with a Santa Claus visit on board while it taxied the tarmac. In March 2009, the company announced they were ceasing flight service to Montreal due to financial trouble. Airline service ended in Newfoundland in May 2009, two months after announcing the shut down of Montreal operations. The airline later continued to fly within Labrador and Quebec, as well as St. Anthony, Newfoundland and Labrador until its merger in 2017.

On February 3, 2012, the company announced that the Nunatsiavut Government had bought a 51% share in Air Labrador.

In June 2017 Air Labrador merged with Innu Mikun Airlines to form Air Borealis.

Destinations 
Air Labrador operates services to the following domestic scheduled destinations (as of February 2017):

Newfoundland and Labrador
Goose Bay (CFB Goose Bay)
Hopedale (Hopedale Airport)
Makkovik (Makkovik Airport)
Nain (Nain Airport)
Natuashish (Natuashish Airport)
Postville (Postville Airport)
Rigolet (Rigolet Airport)
Deer Lake, Newfoundland and Labrador (Deer Lake Regional Airport)

Quebec
Blanc-Sablon (Lourdes-de-Blanc-Sablon Airport)
Chevery (Chevery Airport)
Kegaska (Kegaska Airport)
La Romaine (La Romaine Airport)
La Tabatière (La Tabatière Airport)
Natashquan (Natashquan Airport)
Saint-Augustin (Saint-Augustin Airport)
Sept-Îles (Sept-Îles Airport)
Tête-à-La-Baleine (Tête-à-La-Baleine Airport)

Fleet 

As of July 2017 Transport Canada listed 9 aircraft registered to Air Labrador.

See also 
 List of defunct airlines of Canada

References

External links
 
Official website 

Defunct airlines of Canada
Defunct companies of Newfoundland and Labrador
Companies based in Newfoundland and Labrador
Airlines established in 1948
Airlines disestablished in 2017
Defunct seaplane operators
Regional airlines of Atlantic Canada